Rodion Osievich Kuzmin (9 November 1891, Riabye village in the Haradok district – 24 March 1949, Leningrad) was a Soviet mathematician, known for his works in number theory and analysis.  His name is sometimes transliterated as Kusmin. He was an Invited Speaker of the ICM in 1928 in Bologna.

Selected results
 In 1928, Kuzmin solved the following problem due to Gauss (see Gauss–Kuzmin distribution): if x is a random number chosen uniformly in (0, 1), and

is its continued fraction expansion, find a bound for

where

Gauss showed that Δn tends to zero as n goes to infinity, however, he was unable to give an explicit bound. Kuzmin showed that

where C,α > 0 are numerical constants. In 1929, the bound was improved to C 0.7n by Paul Lévy.

 In 1930, Kuzmin proved that numbers of the form ab, where a is algebraic and b is a real quadratic irrational, are transcendental. In particular, this result implies that Gelfond–Schneider constant

is transcendental. See Gelfond–Schneider theorem for later developments.

 He is also known for the Kusmin-Landau inequality: If  is continuously differentiable with monotonic derivative  satisfying   (where  denotes the Nearest integer function) on a finite interval , then

Notes

External links
  (The chronology there is apparently wrong, since J. V. Uspensky lived in USA from 1929.)

1891 births
1949 deaths
People from Gorodoksky Uyezd
Soviet mathematicians
Number theorists
Mathematical analysts
Academic staff of Perm State University